Gridlink Interconnector is a proposed submarine power cable between England and France. The 1,400MW  HVDC connector would link Kingsnorth National Grid substation in north Kent, England, with RTE Warande substation in Bourbourg (Nord) near Dunkirk in northern France.

Background
Electricity interconnectors are high-voltage transmission links, linking two electricity grids. Electricity can flow in both directions, allowing a grid to import electricity when it is running short so it does not have to fire up old, inefficient fossil fuel power stations. Renewable sources are dependent on the time of day and on the weather conditions; the required load can be balanced by interconnecting grids over a large region, in this case over the Northern Seas Offshore Grid, and the North–South Western EU Interconnections.

Current status
On 28 January 2022 the  rejected an investment request by Gridlink to operate the interconnector in France citing legal uncertainties and possibly reduced benefits due to Brexit, stating that  "The cost-benefit analysis of the project does not show with sufficient certainty, on average based on the available contrasted scenarios, that the project brings a net benefit to the community."
.

Technical description
The project to build this  interconnector comprises 
Underground cables from the shoreline to the converter station at Kingsnorth and Warande.
Converter stations in Kingsnorth and Warande where the HVDC voltage is converted to 400kV AC, which is the working voltage of both the networks.
Underground high-voltage connector cables from the converter stations to the UK and French networks
An additional substation in France.

Proposed project timescale
The projected timescale is:
Awarded Project of Common Interest status (PCI) by European Commission 23 November 2017 (Commission Delegated Regulation 2018/540)
Application for UK development consents September 2020, and in France November 2020.
Construction contracts to be awarded July 2021, detailed planning consents September 2021.
Construction starts December 2021
Commissioning June 2024
Commercial operations start December 2024

Route
 
The undersea cable connects two national grids, so must run from locations, close to the coast, capable of injecting the extra 1.4GW of power into the grid. Three points in Northern France were considered Penly, Les Attaques and Warande. Only Warande had sufficient capacity. On the UK side sites along the south coast were rejected as there was not sufficient infrastructure available to transport the electricity to the main network, while the North Kent coast and the banks of Thames Estuary was well supported. The following seven suitable sites were considered before Kingsnorth was selected: Cleve Hill, Coryton, Grain, Kemsley, Kingsnorth, Northfleet East and Rayleigh Main. The existing Kingsnorth sub-station already had the capacity, as the Kingsnorth coal fired power station had been decommissioned, and was 1.5km (1 mile) from the shore.

The 400kV AC link from the substation at Kingsnorth passes though a 1.5km (1 mile) underground duct to the converter station which is on the shoreline. The two HVDC undersea cables enter a trench under the sea perpendicular to the shore and under the shipping channel where it follows the southern bank until off Grain where it crosses the channel and leaves the Medway passing to the north of the Sheppey anchorage berths.

The  cable lies on the seabed protected by a covering of rocks or in a trench. Other users must not be disrupted, and a series of hazards must be avoided: anchorages, navigation channels, environmentally sensitive areas, known wrecks, moving sandbanks, unexploded ordnance, windfarms and other subsea cables. The route was chosen to take all this into account, and to turn south on the most western route to minimise cable length. In the Thames, it runs to the south of the Pan Sands sand bank and south of the BritNed interconnector cable.

The 400kV AC link travels  underground to the new Warande substation that is to be built adjacent to the existing RTE Bourbourg substation; they will share connection to the 400kV AC overhead lines of the RTE.

References

External links
Gridlink Interconnector HomePage
Non-technical summary of the project

Kent
Electrical interconnectors to and from Great Britain
Electric power infrastructure in England
Electric power infrastructure in France
HVDC transmission lines
National Grid (Great Britain)
Electrical interconnectors in the North Sea